Alang is a census town in Bhavnagar district in the Indian state of Gujarat. Because it is home to the Alang Ship Breaking Yard, Alang beaches are considered the world's largest ship graveyard.

Demographics
As of the 2001 Indian census, Alang had a population of 18,464. Males constitute 82% of the population and females 18%. Alang has an average literacy rate of 62%, higher than the national average of 59.5%; with 89% of the males and 11% of females literate. Seven percent of the population is under 6 years of age.

Economy

Mithi Virdi nuclear power plant 

The proposed nuclear plant has faced heavy opposition from the local population. The area around the proposed plant is known for growing some of the highest-quality kesar mango trees.

Ship Breaking Yard

In popular culture
On the Road to Alang is a 2005 documentary on passenger ships scrapped at Alang, by Peter Knego of Maritime Matters.

Shipbreakers is a 2004 documentary on the industry in Alang by Michael Kot.

World War Z, a 2006 novel by Max Brooks, features Alang as a destination for refugees seeking to escape a zombie plague by sea.

Battlefield 2042, a 2021 first-person shooter, features Alang as the setting for the multiplayer map Discarded.

See also
List of companies of India
Ship-Submarine Recycling Program
Alang Ship Breaking Yard
Gadani Ship Breaking Yard
Chittagong Ship Breaking Yard
Aliağa Ship Breaking Yard

References

External links
Analysis at Alang Today

Gulf of Khambhat
Cities and towns in Bhavnagar district
Port cities in India
Ports and harbours of Gujarat
Ship breaking
Ship graveyards